The Lechința or Comlod is a right tributary of the river Mureș in Transylvania, Romania. It discharges into the Mureș in the village Lechința, near Iernut. Its Hungarian name is from the “komló” for hops, so its name means “Hops Creek”.

Tributaries
The following rivers are tributaries to the river Lechința (from source to mouth):

Left: Ghemeș, Bozed
Right: Ghilbulcuț, Valea Mare (Șopteriu), Urmeniș, Ulieș, Sărături, Drăculea, Valea Lungă, Icland

References

Rivers of Romania
Rivers of Bistrița-Năsăud County
Rivers of Mureș County